Ardhangi is a 1955 Indian Telugu-language drama film, produced and directed by P. Pullayya under the Ragini Pictures banner. It stars Santha Kumari, Savitri, and Akkineni Nageswara Rao. Music is composed by Master Venu and B. Narasimha Rao. Acharya Aatreya scripted the film based on Maddipatla Suri's Telugu translation of the Bengali novel Swayamsidda written by Manilal Banerjee. The film was successful at the box office. It has received the National Film Award for Best Feature Film in Telugu and the Filmfare Award for Best Film - Telugu. The film was remade in Tamil as Pennin Perumai and in Hindi as Bahurani (1963).

Plot
Zamindar Bhujangarao has two sons. The elder son Raghunath Rao born to his first wife is developmentally disabled. After his first wife's death, the Zamindar marries Rajeswari and the couple has a son Nagendra Rao / Naagu who is shown to be a man of vices. Naagu is cruel to his half-brother. Impressed by the way Padma, a village girl, faces Naagu when he threatens to take their farmlands, the Zamindar arranges for Naagu to marry her. But Rajeswari vetoes the alliance and instead suggests that Raghu marry Padma instead. After the wedding, Padma learns that Raghu's disability is due to the opium used to put him to sleep as a child by the maid, Ayamma. Padma takes up the task of helping him, keeping the cruel Naagu at a distance from him.

The Zamindar rewrites the will, leaving everything to Raghu before dying. But Raghu leaves the property to the peeved Rajeswari and Naagu. He then goes into the village to live there with his wife. Naagu brings his lover Neelaveni, who along with her entourage are eyeing Naagu's property. When he learns that the farmers paid the tax to Raghu, an enraged Naagu goes to the village with a rifle. At the same time, Raghu brings the money to give it to him. A repentant Rajeswari along with Raghu, reaches the village to convince Naagu to come to his senses. When she fails, she takes the rifle and aims at him. Padma shields him as Naagu realizes his mistake.

Cast
 Santha Kumari as Rajeswari Devi
 Savitri as Padmavati
 Akkineni Nageswara Rao as Raghunatha Rao / Raghu
 Gummadi as Zamindar Bhujangarao
 Jaggayya as Nagendra Rao / Nagu
 Surabhi Balasaraswathi as Neelaveni
 Chadalavada as Bheemudu
 Nagabhushanam as Veeraiah
 Dr. Sivaramakrishnaiah as Appula Sivakamaiah
 Dr. Kamaraju as Diwanji Kakkaiah
 Doraiswamy as Bhushaiah
 B. Narasimha Rao as Musalaiah

Production 
P. Pullayya originally wanted N. T. Rama Rao to play the mentally disabled Raghu and Akkineni Nageswara Rao as Raghu's half-brother Nagu. Nageswara Rao felt the negative role would not suit him, and was later cast as Raghu, which he preferred as he considered it "more challenging". The role of Nagu ultimately went to Jaggayya. Pullayya cast Gummadi as the zamindar Bhujangarao at the suggestion of film producer T. V. S. Sastri.

Soundtrack
Music composed by Master Venu & B. Narasimha Rao. Lyrics were written by Acharya Aatreya.

Box office
The film ran for more than 100 days in 5 centers in Andhra Pradesh.

Awards
 1955 - National Film Award for Best Feature Film in Telugu - Certificate of Merit

References

External links
 

1955 films
Telugu films remade in other languages
1950s Telugu-language films
Films directed by P. Pullayya
Films about intellectual disability
Developmental disabilities
Indian drama films
1955 drama films
Indian black-and-white films
Films scored by Master Venu
Films scored by B. Narasimha Rao